Ian Noe (born May 9, 1990) is a singer-songwriter from Beattyville, Kentucky US. Noe's debut album Between The Country  was produced by Dave Cobb who plays guitar on the album, while Adam Gardner plays bass and organ piano.

In 2007 Ian Noe won the grand prize in the Appalachian Starsearch in Hazard, Kentucky with his original song Don't Let The Morning Bring Ya Down.

His subject matter includes death, addiction, lost love, and poverty.

Noe is featured performing several of his songs on a Jason Momoa video and he supported John Prine on tour in Germany, Sweden and Norway in 2019. Noe has also supported Son Volt, Jamestown Revival and Blackberry Smoke.

In June 2019 he was cover image of Spotify's Fresh Folk playlist.

Discography

Albums

EPs
 Off This Mountaintop (2018)

Links
 Official Website

References

American male singer-songwriters
1990 births
Musicians from Kentucky
Living people
People from Lee County, Kentucky
American singer-songwriters
Thirty Tigers artists